Bahmanshir-e Jonubi Rural District is a rural district (dehestan) in the Central District of Abadan County, Khuzestan Province, Iran. At the 2006 census, its population was 8,812, in 1,614 families.  The rural district has 9 villages.

References 

Rural Districts of Khuzestan Province
Abadan County